Petr Lohnický (born 1 August 1941) is a Czech former swimmer. He competed in three events at the 1964 Summer Olympics.

References

1941 births
Living people
Czech male swimmers
Olympic swimmers of Czechoslovakia
Swimmers at the 1964 Summer Olympics
Sportspeople from Hradec Králové